WSIP (1490 AM) is a sports radio station licensed to Paintsville, Kentucky, United States.  The station is currently owned by Forcht Broadcasting and features programming from CBS Sports Radio. The station first aired on April 4, 1949. The station also broadcasts online via Official Stream Page, on Apple and Android mobile devices, and has an Alexa skill.

The station began airing the sports format in 2018, when the previous Classic Hits format was moved to sister station WKYH.

References

External links

SIP
Sports radio stations in the United States
Paintsville, Kentucky